The Tale of the Woodcutter and his Daughters (German: Die Geschichte von dem Holzhauer und seinen Töchtern) is an Egyptian folktale related to the international cycle of the Animal as Bridegroom. It mostly follows subtype ATU 425D, "The Vanished Husband", which segues into tale type ATU 425B, "The Son of the Witch", with the heroine's tasks for the supernatural husband's mother - subtypes of the more general type ATU 425, "The Search for the Lost Husband".

Source
German orientalist Enno Littmann collected this tale from an informant named Maḥmûd, who heard the story in Giza.

Summary
A poor woodcutter finds a horse drinking rosewater and eating almond nuts. To his surprise, the horse defecates money. The woodcutter becomes rich, buys a palace and marries his two elder daughters to princes, while the youngest prefers the company of the strange horse. The horse gives her beautiful, gem-encrusted garments to wear at her sisters' weddings, which draws the attention of the queen. The woodcutter's youngest daughter betrays the horse's secret and he departs.

The girl, named "Herrin der Schönheit und Anmut" ("Mistress of Beauty and Grace"), falls into a state of despair, and her father opens a public bath house for everyone to share stories. One day, an old spinner and her daughter go to the bath house and tell the girl about a strange scene: on a certain night, she saw a rooster screaming, and a man on a ship lamenting over a betrayed secret. The girl asks to be taken to that place. The three women arrive, and see a hen singing a joyous tune, while the man appears on his ship, still lamenting over his secret. The girl goes to him and asks for his forgiveness. He explains he is a king, and that his mother wants to marry him to a princess.

The man then takes the human girl to meet his mother. He tells her she is a servant, and the mother forces the girl to do chores for her son's upcoming wedding: to separate a heap of mixed cereals (beans, wheat, corn and barley) and to clean her palace with a beaded cloth and a broom decorated with pearls and emeralds. For the first task, the king whistles and the birds come to separate the cereal grains for her, and commands his servants to clean the palace instead of her. His mother later talks to him in private about the girl, and he reveals the whole story. The mother admits that, if he loves her, and she loves him, she sees no problem in signing the marriage contract between them. They celebrate their wedding.

Analysis

Tale type
The tale is related to the cycle of the Animal as Bridegroom or the Search for the Lost Husband. Scholar Hasan M. El-Shamy classified the tale, according to the international Aarne-Thompson-Uther Index, as types ATU 425B, "The Son of the Witch", and ATU 425D, "The Vanished Husband".

Type ATU 425B, "The Son of the Witch", is considered by scholarship to correspond to the ancient Graeco-Roman myth of Cupid and Psyche, that is, the supernatural husband's mother forces the heroine, her daughter-in-law, to perform difficult and impossible tasks for her.

In tale type ATU 425D, "The Vanished Husband", after betraying her supernatural husband's secret, she builds an inn, hospital or bath house to listen to passers-by's stories. One day, she listens to a person's narration about a flock of birds transforming into men in a place somewhere. The heroine recognizes it is about her husband and asks to be taken there.

Motifs
According to researcher Samia Al Azharia Jahn, the supernatural bridegroom may appear as a horse, a goat or a camel in Arab variants.

Variants

Turkey
Scholars Wolfram Eberhard and Pertev Naili Boratav established a catalogue for Turkish folktales, the Typen türkischer Volksmärchen ("Turkish Folktale Catalogue"). In their joint work, Eberhard and Boratav grouped tales with the supernatural husband in animal form under type TTV 98, "Der Pferdemann" ("The Horse Man"), which corresponded in the international classification to tale type AaTh 425.

In one variant collected in Develi, the supernatural husband is a horse. After the wedding, the horse reveals his true nature and asks his wife to keep it a secret. He takes part in a Cirit competition for three days, wearing red, white, then black garments. The heroine betrays his trust and loses him. Later, she opens a free bath house; an old woman and her son tell the heroine where they found her husband. After she goes to her mother-in-law's house, she is forced to do chores for her: to sweep the floor with a broom; to wash clothes a certain way, and to get musical instruments from a relative of her mother-in-law. Next, her mother-in-law places the heroine as candlebearer to her husband's marriage to the false bride, hoping that the candles will burn her.

In one variant collected in Ankara, the supernatural husband is a camel. The king's daughter marries the camel, who reveals he is a man underneath the animal form. He takes part in a war to defend the kingdom, and his wife betrays his trust. After he vanishes, she opens a free bath house; an old woman and her son tell the heroine where they found her husband. After she goes to her mother-in-law's house, she is forced to do chores for her: to fill many jars with her tears; to fill sacks with bird feathers, and lastly to get musical instruments from a relative of her mother-in-law for the supernatural husband's marriage to a false bride. This tale contains the episode of the Magic Flight: as the heroine and her husband escape from his mother's clutches, they shapeshift into a garden (her) and a garden-keeper (him).

Syria 
In a Syrian tale collected by Uwe Kuhr with the title Seepferd ("Sea-Horse"), a king has three daughters and is gifted a wonderful horse "from the sea". The horse falls in love with the youngest, princess Lapislazuli, and one day, takes off the horsekin and becomes a youth. He reveals he is the king of ghouls. The king marries his daughter Lapislazuli to the horse. The horse takes off the horseskin and takes part in a racing contest in human shape, but his wife cannot tell the secret. He wins, but she betrays his secret in a moment of pride and he vanishes. Later, she builds a public bath house. One day, a poor woman and her daughter wake up in a moonlit night and reach a meadow, where a man's voice orders tables and chairs to be set, laments over a lost love named Lapislazuli and has a meal with some companions. The woman and her daughter go to the public bath house and tell the princess the story, who asks to be taken to the meadow. Lapislazuli recognizes her husband and sees him, but Seepferde explains that he is to be married to his cousin, that his family and friends are ghouls that may devour her, but she can earn the mother's favour by suckling her breasts. Seepferde takes Lapislazuli to the ghoul village and introduces her to his mother as a servant. Seepferde's ghoul mother forces Lapislazuli to do chores for the upcoming wedding: to sweep the floor with a tiny broom in a room full of pearls, to wash a pile of dirty clothes with a tiny bar of soap, and to get a sieve from the ghoul's sister. Seepferde summons his servants to do the chores for her, and instructs her to suckle on his aunt's breasts to avoid being eaten when she goes to get the sieve. As the wedding approaches, the ghoul mother orders Lapislazuli to hold a candle on each finger and to accompany the bride to the dressing room. During the occasion, Seepferde appears and plans with Lapizlazuli to burn the bride's hair. Lapislazuli goes back to the bride's dressing room and burns the bride's hair with the candles. While the ghouls try to put out the fire, Lapislazuli and Seepferde fly back to her kingdom, where they celebrate a new wedding.

In a variant collected from a Syrian refugee and published in 2015 with the title The Bewitched Camel, a woodcutter finds a camel that produces golden eggs in the forest and brings it home. One day, he brings the camel to the market and it falls in love with the princess. The camel asks the woodcutter's wife to ask for the hand of the princess, but the king demands he fulfills two tasks first: to bring extraordinary things and to build a castle overnight. The camel does and marries the princess. On the wedding night, the camel reveals he is a bewitched prince, and that his secret must stay between them. One day, the camel-prince fights in a war to defend the kingdom. The princess's sisters mock her marriage and she tells them the truth. The camel-prince disappears. She is advised by the minister to build a hammam (a public bathhouse), where everyone shall share stories. One day, a poor widow comes to the bathhouse and tells a story about a man coming out of the earth near a tree at night with three apples, lamenting over a lover who betrayed him. The princess notices it is her husband and goes to the place the widow described. She sees the earth cracking open and a prince comes out of it. She embraces him and he tells her that the witch cursed him to live underground. He takes her to the witch and she pretends to be a maid. The witch orders her to sweep her house with a beaded broom and not lose any bead, and to carry a heavy closed box to her sister's house in another country, which the princess accomplishes with the camel-prince's help: in the latter, while the wife rests a bit, the box opens on its own and snakes and monkeys leap out of it; her husband comes, draws the animals back into the box and closes it. Lastly, the witch decides to marry the camel-prince and orders the princess to dance at their wedding. As per the camel-prince's advice, the princess asks for a lantern and a wick to dance with, which, during the wedding, the camel-prince takes and throws it at the witch. They vanquish her and return to the princess's castle.

In a Syrian tale translated as Gomena, principe dei ginn ("Gomena, Prince of the Djinni"), a poor fisherman lives with his three daughters. After two unlucky fishing trips, he catches a large stone from the sea and, upon his third daughter's suggestion, places it as a makeshift door for their home. Later the same day, the third daughter meets a handsome stranger, they connect and she marries him. Despite a comfortable life, her husband only appears at night, so, after some convincing by some women in the hamman (bath house), she decides to come clean to him. The man tells her to get the stone, throw it back to the sea, and to wait for the sunrise. She obeys; her husband appears in the sea, slowly submerging. She insists to know his name, and shouts to him; he reveals his name is Gomena, and vanishes under the waves, and so her palaces and every treasure, save for her jewels on her. She sells her jewelry and opens a hammam, where everyone gets to bathe in exchange for a story. One night, a woman prepares to visit the hammam, but, since it is midnight and she is afraid of the ghouls, she climbs up a tree. She then sees three ginns appear, sing a song and announce the coming of Gomena; a table is set with a meal, Gomena appears and laments his lost love. The woman goes to the bath house and tells the girl about the scene. The girl goes to the place the woman described and waits until midnight for Gomena. He appears, sings verses of yearning and sorrow, and the girl appears to him, begging for his forgiveness. Gomena explains that his parents are the rulers of the ginns, and might kill her. After some insistence, Gomena takes his human wife on a magic carpet to his parents' palace. Before he enters, Gomena gives his wife an almond, a nut, and a pistachio nut for her to plant. However, the plants do grow overnight, but are stolen. Without food, she enters the ginns' service. One day, the queen of the ginns betrothes Gomena to a female ginn, and orders the girl to go to queen's sister, invite her for Gomena's wedding and get the box of the marching band. Gomena explains that this task is a trap: his aunt is a ghoul and will devour her, so he gives her two pieces of cow meat to throw to two ferocious dogs, and advises her to get the box and escape. The human girl follows the instructions and flees from the aunt's house. She opens the box on the way back and small creatures playing instruments escape from it. Gomena gets the creatures back into the box. Next, the queen of the ginns orders the human girl to go back to the aunt's house and get from her a ceremonial carpet. She gets the carpet (a small one) and unrolls it on the way back. Gomena appears to wrap it again, and concocts a plan with his human wife: she is to dance at the wedding, but she is to ask for two torches. The next day, during the wedding, the human girl dances with the torches, to the ginns' amazement. She then tosses one torch on the bride's lap, the other on the ginn assemblage, and escapes with Gomena on a winged horse.

Assyrian people
Russo-Assyrian author  translated and published a tale from the Assyrian people, titled "Теленок" ("The [Bull] Calf"). In this tale, an old couple find a bull calf on their doorstep and take him in. Later, the little animal asks his mother to woo the princess for him. The king hears her proposal, but asks him to perform some tasks first: first, to build a large palace as splendid as the king's; then, to amass as much gold as silver as the king has, and lastly, to create pathways of marble decorated with fountains between the old couple's house and the king's palace. The bull calf turns into a human youth, rubs a ring and with a command fulfills the king's orders. He marries the princess and, on the wedding night, takes off the bovine skin, but wears it again in the morning. One day, the princess tells her mother about her husband's woman form, and the queen advises her to ask for his bull calf skin and burn it in a tandoor oven. The princess tricks her husband, is given the animal skin and burns it, despite her husband's warnings. The human bull calf becomes a bird and flies away. The princess goes after him with iron shoes and an iron cane, but cannot find him. Seeing that her iron shoes are worn out, she then builds an inn to give food and water to travellers in exchange for news of her husband. One day, a father and duo son come to the inn and tell the princess about a strange sight: the son went looking for their donkeys, saw three camels delivering flour to a mill and three pigeons (one yellow, one white, one blue) perched on their donkeys talking about lost wives; the blue one about his who has built an inn. After listening to the story, the princess asks to be guided to the place where the duo. The princess arrives at the mill and meets her husband, who tells her his family might kill her. Despite the danger, the princess opts to be with him, and he hides her with her sister. However, his mother discovers the princess and imposes chores on her: to wash a piece of white wool black and to wash the blackened wool,  white again, then to go to her sister and get a comb. The princess's husband helps her in all tasks: to get the comb - which is a trap, since his aunt might devour her -, she is to use a command to a river of pus and blood, give the correct fodder for a lion and a horse; get the comb in the aunt's barn and escape. The princess follows his advice and escapes. Finally, the mother-in-law weds her son to her niece, but he kills his cousin and escapes with the princess. They change shape to throw off their pursuers: first, an old man (him) and a mill (the princess); and a gardener (him) and a cucumber orchard (the princess). The husband's sisters notice the cucumber orchard is the princess, but stay their hand and go back to their mother. The princess and her husband return to her kingdom and celebrate a new wedding.

Lebanon
Researcher Samia Al Azharia Jahn collected a Lebanese tale titled Sitt Ward from informant Karam al-Bustanl, around Dar al Qamar, which was reprinted by author Ursula Assaf-Nowak with the title Fräulein Ward ("Mistress Ward"). In this tale, a king has three daughters, the youngest named Ward ("Rose"). One day, he buys a fine-looking Arab horse with blue-black colt. The horse can only feed if Ward gives it some food. The king notices the interactions between the horse and the youngest daughter, and suggests she moves to the stables. In her new quarters, princess Ward sees a man with her: the man reveals that he is the horse, named Maimun, son of the king of the Djinni of the Waq-Waq island, and that his equine form is due to a talisman on his cousin's hair. Ward promises to keep his secret. Later, Maimun fights in a war to protect his father-in-law kingdom: on the first day, in blue robes and riding a blue horse; on the second day, in red robes and riding a red horse; and on the third day, in white robes and riding a white horse. Ward reveals the secret and he disappears. She wanders the world, trying to find Waq-Waq, to no avail. She then goes to another country and builds a castled inn, where people are to come and tell stories. A boy and his mother plan to go there, but, during a storm on the way there, they hide in the hollow of a tree and see a strange sight: tables and chairs appear before them, 40 doves and a golden bird come and become maidens and man, and the man, after the doves depart, cuts an apple into four pieces and laments over a lost love who betrayed him. The boy and the grandmother go to Sitt Ward's castle and tell her the story. Sitt Ward goes to the tree, sees the scene on the 7th day, and follows the man - her husband Maimun - into a crevice. Maimun takes Ward - not knowing of her identity - as a servant for his family and protects her from his mother, a man-eating ghoul. Some time later, Ward wakes Maimun up one night and they reconcile. The man says he is to be married to another bride, but they can cause a distraction during the wedding: on the wedding day, Ward torches the bride's hair with a candle; it catches on fire, and so do the hairs of Maimun's cousins. Ward and Maimun seize the opportunity to escape back to her kingdom, him in the shape of a large golden bird. Samia Jahn stated that the Egyptian tale from Giza (see above) shows the same conclusion as Sitt Ward: the supernatural husband's mother forces tasks on his human wife.

See also
The Golden Crab
Princess Himal and Nagaray
Cupid and Psyche
Graciosa and Percinet
The Green Serpent
The King of Love
Prunella
Ulv Kongesøn (Prince Wolf)
The Golden Root
The Horse-Devil and the Witch
Tulisa, the Wood-Cutter's Daughter
 Khastakhumar and Bibinagar
 Habrmani
 La Fada Morgana
 The Son of the Ogress
 Yasmin and the Serpent Prince

References 

African fairy tales
Egyptian fairy tales
Fictional princes
Male characters in fairy tales
Female characters in fairy tales
Fiction about shapeshifting
ATU 400-459